Salvador Silvestre del Rosario Jovellanos Guanes (December 31, 1833 – February 11, 1881) was a Paraguayan politician. He served as Vice President in 1871, and President from December 18, 1871 – November 25, 1874. His main concern as president was Paraguay's slow recovery from Paraguay's defeat in Paraguayan War with Brazil, Argentina and Uruguay. He died in Buenos Aires on February 11, 1881.

He was born in Asunción on December 31, 1833. He was very young when his family left the country during the regime of Carlos Antonio López to settle in Buenos Aires, where he formed his own family.

Exile politics
Jovellanos was one of the founding members of the exile Paraguayan Association on December 28, 1858. After the start of Paraguayan War he signed a request to Argentine government on April 24, 1865, asking it to authorize formation of the Paraguayan Legion that would be formed from exiles and Lopez opponents. He was one of the early supporters of this idea, together with  Otoniel Peña participating in the meeting of the steering committee held on January 18, 1865.

Return to Paraguay 
In mid-January 1869, a couple of weeks after Asuncion was occupied by the Allied forces, Jovellanos returned to his homeland together with other exiles - Juan Bautista Gill, José Segundo Decoud, Juan Antonio Jara, Carlos Loizaga, Benigno Ferreira, Cayo Miltos and others who signed a petition asking the Allies for formation of a Provisional government. On March 25, 1870, he joined the Gran Club del Pueblo (a precursor of Colorado Party) which was led by Facundo Machaín. In the July 3, 1870 elections of National Assembly he is elected from the Cathedral district with 302 votes. Jovellanos was member of the commission that drafted the Constitution of 1870 as well as commission that drafted the Electoral Law. He was Minister of Finance of Paraguay from June 1870 to November 1870.

Presidency

After the death from yellow fever of Vice President Cayo Miltos on January 7, 1871, National Assembly elected Jovellanos to the post of Vice President. During 1871 he also served as Minister of War and Navy and Interior Minister.

Following the resignation of President Cirilo Antonio Rivarola he assumed the post of President during the political upheaval that surrounded the fall of Rivarola. The removal of Rivarola was organized by Juan Bautista Gill in cooperation with Brazilians who wanted to place Gill in Presidency. However, before he could remove the Jovellanos, Gill was arrested on the orders of general Benigno Ferreira and deported from the country. During Jovellanos Presidency General Ferreira remained the power behind the trone.

During his government the Loizaga – Cotegipe Treaty of Peace and Borders with Empire of Brazil was signed on January 9, 1872. With this treaty Paraguay gave up territories north of Apa River and Amambai territory. Peace treaty with Uruguay was signed as well, but relations with Argentine reminded tense.

To rebuild the devastated country, a new loan of 2,000,000 pounds was secured from Great Britain on harsher terms than the 1871 loan. Much of this money was stolen and misused by politicians. This debt was repaid only in 1961.

Jovellanos sought to reorganize the public administration. His government paved some streets of Asuncion; created the Council of Public Education, Immigration office and the Economic and Management Boards. Police and internal revenue services were reorganized. The first tram line was built in Asuncion. It started at the port, went down the street until Colòn Street and Independencia Nacional,  Palma and Libertad Street, now called Eligio Ayala, and reached its endpoint at the Central railway station.

Jovellanos was faced with many coup attempts and finally was forced from power after a rebellion started in 1874 under nationalist General Bernardino Caballero.

After leaving the post of President he left for exile in Buenos Aires where he died.

References

1833 births
1881 deaths
People from Asunción
Paraguayan people of Asturian descent
Colorado Party (Paraguay) politicians
Presidents of Paraguay
Vice presidents of Paraguay
Finance Ministers of Paraguay
Presidents of the Senate of Paraguay
People of the Paraguayan War
Paraguayan emigrants to Argentina